Paul Philip Christiano (February 4, 1976 August 1, 2015) was an American choreographer and dancer, known for his work and successful career in Chicago, Illinois.

Career
Christiano started out as a gymnast. By age twelve, he moved into dance. After high school, he spent three years on a scholarship with the Lou Conte Dance Studio. He joined Hubbard Street II in 1998, Thodos Dance Chicago in 1999, and Lyric Opera of Chicago in 2008. He worked for Joffrey Ballet. As a contemporary concert dancer, he was lauded for his "wondrous skills" and "striking acrobatic skill".

In 2001, he received a Ruth Page Award for his first choreographic effort, Miracle, Interrupted. His choreographed works have since been featured in the repertories of Thodos Dance Chicago, Joffrey Ballet, and River North Dance Chicago, among other dance companies.

Personal life
Christiano grew up in the western suburb of Bartlett. In 1999, he stepped into a federal sting operation when he ordered child pornography. He avoided prison but was permanently added to the Illinois sex offender registry, and received five years of state-ordered therapy. The presence of Christiano's name on the registry frequently interrupted his career. He became "an outcast", made several suicide attempts, and volunteered for US-based pedophilia advocacy group "B4U-ACT". He poisoned and killed himself at the age of 39: "Paul Christiano, who would kill himself six months later after an incident around misreporting his address to the police. [...] There was an inconsistency in the records he gave, and rather than face almost certain prison time, he decided to take his own life."

Selected choreographed works
 Miracle, Interrupted (2001)
 First Love; Second Sight (2003)
 Tyranny of the Geek (2006)
 Virgo (2007)
 Two Sides to Every Studio Apartment (2008)
 ADHDivas (2010)
 Immediate Gratification (2011)
 101 Cures for Boredom (2011)

Awards
 2001: Ruth Page Award, for Miracle, Interrupted
 2001: One of Chicago Tribunes "Chicagoans of the Year"
 2002: Illinois Arts Council Artist Fellowship Award
 2003: COTY (Choreographer of the Year) Award, from Dance Chicago
 2003: Chicago Magazine "Dancer of the year"
 2010: One of Time Outs "Dancing Men of 2010"

See also
 List of dancers

References

External links

2015 deaths
American choreographers
American male dancers
American people convicted of child pornography offenses
People from Bartlett, Illinois
Pedophile advocacy
1976 births
20th-century American dancers
Suicides by poison
Suicides in Illinois
2015 suicides